Spalacopsis ornatipennis is a species of beetle in the family Cerambycidae. It was described by Fisher in 1935.

References

Spalacopsis
Beetles described in 1935